Suolue Township is a rural township in Bama Yao Autonomous County, Guangxi Zhuang Autonomous Region, China.

Administrative division
As of 2017, the township is divided into eighteen villages: 
 Suoxu
 Pobang
 Liaoxiang
 Jialue
 Powan
 Fuxiang
 Pingliu
 Liuneng
 Longfeng
 Shangqin
 Nongzhong
 Baijiu
 Nongyang
 Nongshen
 Jusang
 Caixiang
 Lina
 Liangyin

Geography
The township sits in the west of Bama Yao Autonomous County. It is surrounded by Nashe Township on the northwest, Jiazhuan Town on the northeast, Baise on the west, Yandong Township on the east, and Tianyang County on the south.

The Baidong River flows through the western town north to east.

Demographics
The population of Bama, according to the 2005 census, is 35,033. Here live the Han, Zhuang and Yao nationalities.

Economy
The main industries in and around the town are forestry and farming. The main food crops are rice, corn and cassava. Native products include tea-oil tree, goat, and Bama miniature pig.

Transport
The G78 Shantou-Kunming Expressway passes across the town.

References

Bibliography
 

Townships of Hechi
Divisions of Bama Yao Autonomous County